All flesh is grass ( kol habbasar chatsir), is a phrase found in the Old Testament book of Isaiah, chapter 40, verses 6–8. The English text in King James Version is as follows:

A more modern text, English Standard Version, reads:

Analysis
It was a commonly used epitaph, frequently found for example on old ledger stones and monuments in churches in 17th century England. The phrase is interpreted to mean that human life is transitory ('impotent, perishing, limited').

Uses
It has been used in various works, including:

 "All Flesh is Grass", a poem by English poet Christina Rossetti
 "War Photographer" by the Scottish poet Carol Ann Duffy, where it describes the sights seen in war photographs
 "The Omnivore's Dilemma", a nonfiction book by Michael Pollan
 "Difficulties of a Statesman" by T. S. Eliot, repeated in a line of the poem 
 All Flesh is Grass, a novel by American science fiction writer Clifford D. Simak
 All flesh is Grass: Pleasures & Promises of Pasture Farming, a book on agriculture by American author Gene Logsdon
 All Flesh Is Grass, an album by Norwegian dark metal band Madder Mortem
 King Edward VI and the Pope, inscribed on the pope's chest in the painting 
 Deathbed of Henry VIII, inscribed on the pope's chest in the painting 
 The Shoemakers' Holiday (1599) by Thomas Dekker
 "Denn alles Fleisch es ist wie Gras", the second movement of the German Requiem by Johannes Brahms, used as text
 "Arithmetic on the Frontier", poem by Rudyard Kipling's, used in the first stanza
 "Ten Songs" by W. H. Auden, used in the third stanza of the ninth poem
 The Good Soldier Švejk and His Fortunes in the World War, novel by Jaroslav Hašek's, the volunteer Marek recites it to Švejk
 Heaven's Gate (1980), John Hurt's character Billy Irvine mutters it to himself as
 Cracker, the phrase appears in "The Big Crunch" episode
 En vänlig grönskas rika dräkt by Carl David af Wirsén, it gives the tone to the second part of the 1889 Swedish summer hymn
 "6ix", song by The Lemonheads on the album Car Button Cloth.
 "All Flesh Is Grass", Doctor Who novel written by Una McCormack, released in 2020
 "The Code of the Woosters" by PG Wodehouse, first published in 1938, quoted by Bertie Wooster
"The Bird of Night" by Susan Hill
The Handmaid's Tale by Margaret Atwood  (Waiting Room: Chapter 8), Aunt Lydia references incorrectly as "all flesh is weak"
"The Old Nurses Story" (1852) by Elizabeth Gaskell: "Flesh is grass, they do say..."

References

Hebrew Bible words and phrases
New Testament words and phrases
First Epistle of Peter
Book of Isaiah